Alin Vasile Paleacu (born 19 January 1975) is a Romanian former professional footballer who played as a midfielder. After 2012 Paleacu started his career as a coach, but also played sporadically for lower division teams.

Honours
UM Timișoara
Divizia C: 1998–99
Apulum Alba Iulia
Divizia B: 2002–03
ACS Recaș
Liga III: 2011–12

References

External links
 
 

1975 births
Living people
Sportspeople from Timișoara
Romanian footballers
Association football midfielders
Liga I players
Liga II players
CSM Reșița players
CSM Unirea Alba Iulia players
FC Politehnica Timișoara players
FC CFR Timișoara players
CSM Jiul Petroșani players
FC Gloria Buzău players
FC Internațional Curtea de Argeș players
SKU Amstetten players
CSC Dumbrăvița players
Romanian expatriate footballers
Romanian expatriate sportspeople in Austria
Expatriate footballers in Austria
Romanian football managers